Allegheny station is a rapid transit passenger rail subway station on SEPTA's Broad Street Line. The station is located at 3200 North Broad Street under the intersection of Allegheny Avenue in North Philadelphia, and is strictly for local trains. The station is located next to the Maurice H. Kornberg School of Dentistry, formerly known as the Temple University School of Dentistry.

Station layout

Gallery

References

External links 

 Allegheny Avenue entrance from Google Maps Street View

SEPTA Broad Street Line stations
Railway stations in the United States opened in 1928
Railway stations in Philadelphia
Railway stations located underground in Pennsylvania